The Central Dutch football team represents Central College in college football at the NCAA Division III level. The Dutch are members of the American Rivers Conference (A-R-C), fielding its team in the A-R-C since 1923 when it was named the Iowa Intercollegiate Athletic Conference (IIAC). The Dutch play their home games at Ron and Joyce Schipper Stadium in Pella, Iowa.

Their head coach is Jeff McMartin, who took over the position for the 2004 season.

Conference affiliations
 Unknown (1892–1893; 1903–1905; 1909–1916; 1920–1922)
 Iowa Intercollegiate Athletic Conference (1923–2017; rebranded)
 American Rivers Conference (2018–present)

List of head coaches

Key

Coaches

Year-by-year results

Notes

References

External links
 

 
American football teams established in 1892
1892 establishments in Iowa